FC Družstevník Báč was a Slovak association football club located in Báč, Slovakia. The club was a participant in the Slovak Second Level, making Báč the smallest village to be represented at the second level of any world football league.

Team Colours 
The team plays in an all-white kit.

Former managers

References

External links
Futbalnet profile 

Defunct football clubs in Slovakia
Association football clubs established in 1970
Association football clubs disestablished in 2006